Leila Philip (born April 18, 1961 in New York City) is an American writer, poet and educator. She is the author of award-winning books of nonfiction which have received glowing national reviews. Her books include: Beaverland: How One Weird Rodent Made America, A Family Place: A Hudson Valley Farm, Three Centuries, Five Wars, One Family, Hidden Dialogue: A Discussion Between Women in Japan and the United States, The Road Through Miyama) and one collection of poetry (Water Rising). Philip has been anthologized in a number of books, including: Brief Encounters, Teaching Creative Non-Fiction, Maiden Voyages: Writings of Women Travelers; Family Travels: The Farther You Go the Closer You Get; Japan: True Stories of Life on the Road, A Woman's Passion for Travel. She has contributed articles and reviews to newspapers, magazines, research  and journals including Ploughshares, The Christian Science Monitor, Studio Potter Magazine, the Yomiuri Shimbun and the Daily Yomiuri. Philip was a contributing columnist at The Boston Globe. She has written about art for Artcritical, Asian Diasporic Visual Cultures and the Americas and Art in America. She is the Contributing Editor of Riverteeth: A Journal of Nonfiction Narrative. In 2018, with writer Robin Hemley, she founded the online journal Speculative Nonfiction.

Life
Leila Philip grew up in New York City and graduated from Princeton University in 1986, with a A.B. in Comparative Literature and a Fifth-Year Degree in East Asian Studies From 1983 to 1985, she apprenticed to Nagayoshi Kazu, a master potter in southern Kyushu, then went on to earn an MFA at Columbia University as the Woolrich Fellow in Fiction.

Philip has taught writing and literature at Princeton University, Columbia University, Emerson College, Colgate University, Vassar College, and at the Ohio University as the James Thurber Writer in Residence. In 2004 she joined College of the Holy Cross' English department where she teaches creative writing and literature in the Creative Writing Program and the Environmental Studies Program.

Philip has taught at writing conferences and low residency MFA Programs including Stonecoast, The Chenango Valley Writers Conference, and Fairfield University. Since 2010, she has taught at the MFA Program at Ashland University

Bibliography
 Beaverland: How One Weird Rodent Made America. Twelve Books. Hachette Publishing Group. 2022. . "Beaverland: How One Weird Rodent Made America."
 

A collaboration between Leila Philip and her partner Garth Evans. 100% of the purchase price have been donated to environmental stewardship.

 

One woman's journey to uncover her family's history and understand the ties that bind us to a particular place.

Winner of the Victorian Society Book Award

 

Examines the evolving roles of women in Japan and the implications for Japanese society.

 

The story of Leila Philip's journey to Miyama–a village settled almost four centuries ago by seventy Korean potters–where she was accepted as an apprentice into the workshop and home of master potter Kazy Nagayoshi and his wife, Reiko. The Road Through Miyama brings a charming look at pottery lore and technique, in particular at modern aspirations and traditional attitudes in Japanese life.

Has been included as a travel guide of Japan by National Geographic

Winner of the PEN 1990 Martha Albrand Citation for Nonfiction

Anthologized
 2015: Brief Encounters, edited by Judith Kitchen, (W. W. Norton & Company)
 2010: Why We're Here, edited by Bob Cowser, (Colgate University Press)
 2008: Creating Nonfiction, edited by Becky Bradway, (St. Martin's Press)
 1993: Maiden Voyages, edited by Mary Morris, (Vintage Books)

Awards and honors
 2020 Furthermore Publication Award, J.M, Kaplan Fund
 2020 Society of Environmental Journalists Story Grant Award
 2019 Michigan Humanities Council Fellowship
 2017 American Antiquarian Society Artist & Writers Baron Fellowship for Historical Research
 2015 Ct Arts /NEA Initiative Grant funded by the National Endowment for the Arts
 2014: Pushcart Prize in Literature, Nomination for Water Rising
 2014: National Endowment for the Humanities Summer Stipend
 2007: Guggenheim Fellowship, Literary Nonfiction
 2002: Publication Award, the Victorian Society of America
 2000: National Endowment for the Humanities Fellowship in American Studies
 1999: American Association of University Women, American Fellowship
 1999: Furthermore, J.M. Kaplan Fund
 1994: National Endowment for the Arts Fellowship in Literature
 1991: James Thurber Writer-in-Residence, The Ohio State University, Columbus
 1990: PEN/Martha Albrand Special Citation for Nonfiction.

Published interviews
 2012: The Future of Longform: exploring the Space between Writers and Readers in the new Media Galaxy, "Picturing the Essay", interviewed by Pepi Ronalds, Melbourne, Australia
Future of Long Form
 2011: Writers on the Fly: Unesco Project: Cities of Literature, Iowa City. Interviewed by Ben Hill.
On the Fly: Leila Philip
 2010: River of Words: Portraits of Hudson Valley Writers, edited by Nina Shengold (interview format), SUNY press

References

External links 
 "Leila Philip" at the author's website
 Leila Philip's Profile at her official Facebook page
 Water Rising at her news book's official website
 "Leila Philip" on Amazon's Author Central
 The Boston Globe
 College of the Holy Cross professor profile
 Riverteeth
 Speculative Nonfiction

1961 births
Poets from New York (state)
Writers from New York City
Princeton University alumni
Columbia University School of the Arts alumni
Princeton University faculty
Columbia University faculty
Emerson College faculty
Colgate University faculty
Vassar College faculty
Ohio University faculty
Living people
21st-century American poets